Hernán Fennell (born 2 February 1988) is an Argentine cricketer. He played in the 2013 ICC World Cricket League Division Six tournament and the 2019 South American Cricket Championship, a Twenty20 International (T20I) tournament at El Cortijo Polo Club near Lima, Peru.

Fennell was head coach of a Cricket Sin Fronteras (Cricket Without Borders) cricket team from Buenos Aires that went to Rome in 2017 to play against St Peter’s Cricket Club; there they had an audience with Pope Francis. The project began in 2009 and offers alternatives to violence and crime for young people in at-risk neighborhoods; almost 800 boys and girls, aged between six and twenty, were learning to play cricket in 2017. In 2019 Fennell continues as head coach and participants exceed 1500. Besides being a Level II Coach certified by the West Indies Cricket Board Fennell is a physical education teacher, with a high performance sport registration.

In September 2019, he was named in Argentina's Twenty20 International (T20I) squad for the men's tournament at the 2019 South American Cricket Championship. He made his T20I debut for Argentina, against Mexico, on 3 October 2019.

In November 2021, he was named as the captain of Argentina's squad for the 2021 ICC Men's T20 World Cup Americas Qualifier tournament in Antigua. On 10 November 2021, in Argentina's match against Panama, Fennell became the first bowler for Argentina to take a hat-trick in T20Is.

References

External links
 

1988 births
Living people
Argentine cricketers
Argentina Twenty20 International cricketers
Place of birth missing (living people)